Chou Chia-chi (born 21 August 1983) is a Taiwanese badminton player. Chou was part of the Taiwan national women's team that won the bronze medal at the 2006 Uber Cup in Japan. At the same year she participated at the Asian Games in Doha, Qatar. She competed at the 2007 World Championships in the women's doubles event partnered with Ku Pei-ting, and finished in the quarterfinals round. In 2008, she won double title in the women's and mixed doubles event at the New Zealand Open.

Personal life
In January 2011, Chou married to a former Taiwan national badminton player, Hu Chung-shien.

Achievements

BWF Grand Prix 
The BWF Grand Prix has two levels: Grand Prix and Grand Prix Gold. This series of badminton tournaments has been sanctioned by the Badminton World Federation (BWF) since 2007.

Women's doubles

Mixed doubles

 BWF Grand Prix Gold tournament
 BWF Grand Prix tournament

BWF International Challenge/Series 
Women's doubles

Mixed doubles

 BWF International Challenge tournament
 BWF International Series tournament

References

External links 
 

1983 births
Living people
Taiwanese female badminton players
Badminton players at the 2006 Asian Games
Asian Games competitors for Chinese Taipei